Dmitry Borisovich Vybornov (born 23 February 1970) is a retired male boxer from Russia. He represented his native country at the 1996 Summer Olympics in Atlanta, Georgia, where he was stopped in the first round of the men's light-heavyweight division (– 81 kg) by USA's eventual bronze medalist Antonio Tarver.

References
sports-reference

1970 births
Living people
Light-heavyweight boxers
Boxers at the 1996 Summer Olympics
Olympic boxers of Russia
Russian male boxers